Weed identification may relate to
 History of plant systematics, the classification of plants
 Botany, the study of plants
 Taxonomy, the classification of living things
 Weed plant science
 Weed (disambiguation)